Hyperplatys montana is a species of longhorn beetles of the subfamily Lamiinae. It was described by Casey in 1913, and is known from the southwestern United States.

References

Beetles described in 1913
Endemic fauna of the United States
Acanthocinini